R & W. Paul Ltd. was malting business that also became involved in shipping. By the beginning of the twentieth century it was one of the major businesses in Ipswich.

Origins
The company was founded by Robert Paul (1806-1864) around 1842.

Shipping
Pauls bought the Thames barge Thalatta in August 1933.

References

Companies based in Ipswich